SCCmec, or staphylococcal cassette chromosome mec, is a mobile genetic element of Staphylococcus bacterial species.  This genetic sequence includes the mecA gene coding for resistance to the antibiotic methicillin and is the only known way for Staphylococcus strains to spread the gene in the wild by horizontal gene transfer.

Classification
Not all SCCmec elements are identical (in fact, SCC elements without the mecA gene do exist.)  SCCmec elements have been classified into twelve types (I through XII) on the basis of two specific regions of their nucleotide sequences.  One region is the mec complex including the mecA gene.  The other is the ccr gene complex including genes coding for recombinases.

The mec complex is divided further into five types (I through V) based on the arrangement of regulatory genetic features such as mecR1, an inducer.

Distribution
The SCCmec found in methicillin-resistant Staphylococcus aureus likely originated in coagulase-negative staphylococcal species and was acquired by S. aureus.

Staphylococcal strains isolated from pig farms were found to carry several different types of SCCmec, suggesting that they may serve as a reservoir of these elements.

See also
Mobile genetic elements

References

Molecular biology
Mobile genetic elements